This was the first edition of the tournament.

André Göransson and Ben McLachlan won the title after defeating Evan King and Mitchell Krueger 6–4, 6–7(3–7), [10–5] in the final.

Seeds

Draw

References

External links
 Main draw

Chicago Men's Challenger - Doubles